Khitruk (from хитрый = cunning) is a gender-neutral Russian surname. It may refer to
Anastasia Khitruk (born 1975), Russian-American violin player
Andrey Khitruk (1944–2019), Russian pianist and musicologist, father of Anastasia
Fyodor Khitruk (1917–2012), Russian animator, father of Andrey and grandfather of Anastasia

See also
Khitrov